The Man They Could Not Hang is a play based on the life of John Babbacombe Lee.

The newspaper Lloyd's Weekly had published Lee's story, contributing to the re-opening of the case and Lee's release. Lloyd's then suggested to Lee that he dramatise his story to make some money; Lee agreed and Claude Murrell was commissioned.

The play was turned into an Australian film, The Life Story of John Lee, or The Man They Could Not Hang (1912).

References

1911 plays
English-language plays
John Babbacombe Lee